Daniel Hausmann (born 12 February 2003) is a German footballer who plays as a midfielder for Regionalliga Bayern club SpVgg Unterhaching.

Career
In his youth, Hausmann played for hometown club FC Leutkirch and FC Memmingen, before joining the academy of SpVgg Unterhaching in 2018. He made his professional debut for Unterhaching in the 3. Liga on 6 February 2021, coming on as a substitute in the 88th minute for Alexander Fuchs against SV Meppen. The away match finished as a 3–2 loss.

References

External links
 
 
 

2003 births
Living people
People from Leutkirch im Allgäu
Sportspeople from Tübingen (region)
Footballers from Baden-Württemberg
German footballers
Association football midfielders
FC Memmingen players
SpVgg Unterhaching players
3. Liga players
Regionalliga players
21st-century German people